Coelophoris is a genus of moths of the family Erebidae. The genus was described by Paul Mabille in 1900.

Species
Coelophoris andasy Viette, 1965
Coelophoris ankasoka Viette, 1965
Coelophoris comorensis Viette, 1981
Coelophoris lakato Viette, 1965
Coelophoris lucifer Viette, 1972
Coelophoris marojejy Viette, 1965
Coelophoris pluriplaga Viette, 1956
Coelophoris sogai Viette, 1965
Coelophoris trilineata Mabille, 1900

References

Calpinae